Glenn Sandford (born 20 September 1971) is a former Australian rules footballer who played in the Australian Football League (AFL).

From St Damians, Sandford was a strong ruckman when he made his AFL debut for Collingwood in Round 2, 1993. With Damian Monkhorst the primary ruckman for the club, Sandford was used as a back-up in his five career games, but played mostly at centre half-back when on the ground. 

Sandford played three games in his debut season and another two in 1994 before being delisted by the club.

Sandford then moved to the South Australian National Football League (SANFL), playing for Norwood and North Adelaide.

Glenn now lives in Papua New Guinea and is a four-time Port Moresby Table Tennis (B grade) Open finalist.

References

External links 

1971 births
Collingwood Football Club players
North Adelaide Football Club players
Norwood Football Club players
Australian rules footballers from Victoria (Australia)
Living people